Richard Frankel may refer to:

 Richard B. Frankel, professor of physics
 Richard Frankel (producer) (born 1947), theatre producer